Dendropark "Podillya" is part of the "Podillya" Botanical Gardens at Vinnytsia National Agrarian University.

General information 
It was founded in 1963. It has more than 10,000 seedlings of hornbeam, more than 700 thousand trees and shrubs, over 650 species of plants. Its arboretum hosts over 600 species of trees and shrubs. The botanical garden is located in the western part of Vinnytsia on the northern and southern slopes of the river Vyshnya. It is part of a green ring around the city with the Pirogov museum.

Sections of the dendropark 
The gardens include the following sections:
 Arboretum
 Typological forest department 
 Department of pomology (fruit crops)
 Systematic division of herbaceous plants
 Department ornamental crops
 Nursery ornamental and wild fruit crops
 Department of Science and Environment
 Winter garden with a collection of subtropical plants unique for Podillya

References

Botanical gardens in Ukraine
Vinnytsia